Veil of Darkness is a horror-action-adventure game for MS-DOS, FM Towns and PC-98, which was developed by Event Horizon Software and published by Strategic Simulations in 1993. Veil of Darkness is a third person, 2D point-and-click adventure game with RPG elements featuring a fixed isometric perspective and a fair share of action-RPG style combat.

Gameplay

Veil of Darkness features an isometric point of view, a control panel customizable in size and an inventory system. All actions are controlled by the mouse and by areas / items within the control panel. A player can use either arrow keys for guiding movement or the mouse. The inventory can hold several items, and the Player can also find bags and pouches that enable the Player to carry more items. There is an indication in the control panel for weight (the knapsack bulges when inventory is too heavy), and for health (the Player character in a coffin becomes a skeleton progressively from the feet upwards). There is a 'mirror' that will indicate if the Player has an ailment (aged, cursed, etc.), and also certain ailments show on the Player's face in the Player portrait in the control panel. In conversations, the Player can click on a certain underlined word to pursue that topic, or the Player can type a word when the input cursor appears. If the typed word is appropriate, the Player will receive a response. To end a conversation, the Player would click 'Bye' or type 'Bye'.

The game is non-linear: the player can wander about and explore freely within an area, but certain places or actions cannot progress until the Player has done certain actions and/or found certain items. The player moves around in a dark valley, solving puzzles and occasionally killing monsters such as werewolves, vampires and skeletons. Different weapons work with different enemies, so the Player needs to find the right weapon for each battle. Also, one needs to find different plants (and sometimes other items) to cure different ailments. The puzzles are typical of a point-and-click adventure game. Some of them require very good reasoning. The puzzles consist mainly of piecing together what the Player learns from conversations, finding and using objects and finding ways to get into locked areas or past a guardian.

Plot
The Player assumes the role of a cargo pilot whose plane is shot down by a mysterious force while flying over a remote valley in Romania. A helpful village girl named Deirdre Kristoverikh rescues the Player from the crash and takes the Player to her father Kiril, who informs them that their arrival via plane crash marks them as the chosen one who is prophesied to destroy Kairn.

Kairn is the local vampire lord who long ago murdered his father and brothers so he could inherit control of the valley. Becoming a vampire, he's used his powers to cut off contact with the outside world. The valley rests in perpetual darkness or as the game's title suggests a “veil of darkness” and the Player moves about the map, learning of new locations from the populace as you assist in various quests.

As Kairn has cut off all ways out of the valley, the only way the Player is going to leave is by fulfilling the Prophecy, an ancient curse put upon Kairn by his original source of power, a tome known as the Agrippa. The Player uses the Prophecy scroll as a guide and after bringing aid to many in the village, finally confronts Kairn at his fortress.

The Player defeats Kairn by performing a number of tasks that weaken the vampire to the point that a stake in the heart will kill him. Upon the destruction of Kairn, the Player and Deidre head for America via steamer ship.

Main characters
The Player - The Player assumes the role of a cargo pilot whose appearance is that of a young Caucasian male with blond hair. The Player can type in any name or alias they wish, and all in game characters will often refer to him by that name.

Kairn - Kairn is the primary antagonist of the game: an evil nobleman who has become a vampire and subsequently plagued the valley over which he rules with an iron fist. Kairn's origins and back story are revealed in a story called The Forge of The Evil Heart which can be found preceding the Prophecy in the game manual. A major plot point of Veil of Darkness is the Player's need to discover the real name of Kairn. The name - contained in the pages of the Agrippa - is chosen randomly from a long list. A partial list of those names include: Beaulu, Bhenblod, Brcko, Dauthr, Drak, Malachi, T'san, and Yfelan.

Kirill Khristoverikh - The richest and most powerful man in the Valley, Kirill acts as a guide for the Player and instructs them in the Prophecy. He is also quite corrupt, and despite wishing to free himself and the others from Kairn's evil grip, he willingly hands his daughter to the vampire. He also keeps his son Andrei in an upstairs bedroom as a zombie, unwilling to kill him.

Deidre Khristoverikh - The female lead, she is the one who saves the Player and is later given to Kairn by her father Kirill. Deidre plays a small active role in the game itself, merely acting as a love interest and a damsel in distress for the end battle.

The Agrippa - The Agrippa is an ancient and powerful book of dark magic. Used by Kairn to achieve his power, he later saw it as a threat and had it chained in a secret room in a cave. It threw a curse on him which is the prophecy that forever threatens Kairn. When the Player speaks with the Agrippa, they become affected by the Brimstone curse and must remedy it by using the Dismissals of Evil Vol. III, which is located in Kairn's fortress. No one will talk to or help them until the curse has been removed.

Intellectual property rights
Event Horizon Software has ceased to exist as a company long ago. The company has developed three other games: The Summoning, Dusk of the Gods and DarkSpyre.

Strategic Simulations, Inc. was bought by Ubisoft in 2004.

Reception

Computer Gaming World stated that Veil of Darkness "held me in rapt attention until I had seen it through to its resolution". While critical of the brief length of the game, the magazine stated that "the experience is one to be savored ... definitely one that I am glad to have played". The magazine later nominated Veil of Darkness for its Role-Playing Game of the Year award, alongside The Summoning. Power Unlimited gave a score of 70% writing: "Veil of Darkness may not have an original story (it's very similar to Dracula), but there are plenty and many assignments, all of which work together to keep the game fun. Only the intro is a bit too long."

References

External links

Unveil An open-source project dedicated to extract VoD resources and provide a map viewer.

1993 video games
Action-adventure games
DOS games
Strategic Simulations games
Video games about vampires
NEC PC-9801 games
FM Towns games
Video games developed in the United States
Point-and-click adventure games
Video games with isometric graphics
DreamForge Intertainment games